The Sword of Moses may refer to:

 The Sword of Moses, an apocryphal book of ancient Hebrew magic
 The Sword of Moses (novel), a 2013 novel by Dominic Selwood